Anthony Pelle (born December 1, 1972) is an American professional basketball player who was selected by the Denver Nuggets in the second round (44th overall pick) of the 1995 NBA Draft. Pelle, who was born in the Bronx, New York and played collegiately at Villanova University and Fresno State University, did not appear in any NBA games but plied his trade several leagues in Europe, most notably in Greece, Spain and Italy as well as in second-tier leagues in the United States.

College career
After coming out of Stevenson High, in the Bronx Pelle committed to Villanova to play under coach Steve Lappas. He stayed in Villanova for three seasons, appeared in 81 games and averaged 3.1 points per game, 2.5 rebounds per game and 1.2 blocks per game. At the time he left Villanova, in 1193, he was fourth all-time in blocked shots for the school. In May 1993 Pelle was arrested for assaulting another student. After getting transferred to Fresno State he sat out for the 1993–1994 season. In his last year of college eligibility Pelle appeared in 24 games for the Bulldogs averaging 10.8 points per game, 8.0 rebounds per game and 2.0 blocks per game.

Professional career
Pelle was drafted 44th overall in the 1995 NBA Draft by the Denver Nuggets. In 1995 Pelle signed for AEK in the Greek Basket League. In the following season he played for CB Girona where he averaged 10.1 points, 8.6 rebounds and 3.0 blocks per game in 33 games. Subsequently, Pelle played for several teams in Italy, Cyprus, Portugal, Turkey, Germany. Pelle has also played in second-tier leagues in the US (ABA, CBA, NBDL and USBL). On September 30, 2002 he signed for the Detroit Pistons as a free agent but he was waived after a few days.

References

External links 
Player profile at USAbasket.com

1972 births
Living people
AEK B.C. players
American expatriate basketball people in Greece
American expatriate basketball people in Spain
Basketball players from New York City
CB Girona players
Denver Nuggets draft picks
Fresno State Bulldogs men's basketball players
Greek Basket League players
Liga ACB players
Papagou B.C. players
Sportspeople from the Bronx
Villanova Wildcats men's basketball players
American men's basketball players
Centers (basketball)